Bhan Singh Bhaura (4 September 1934 – 3 January 2004) was an Indian politician. He was a leader of the Communist Party of India in Punjab. He served as a member of the National Executive of the CPI as well as president for the Bharatiya Khet Mazdoor Union. He was also a Punjab State Executive member of CPI. He was elected to the Lok Sabha (lower house of the parliament of India) in 1971 and 1999 from the Bhatinda seat. He was elected to the Punjab Legislative Assembly twice as well.

Student activism
Bhaura hailed from a poor peasant family in village Niamatpur Near Amargarh Sangrur district. He was the son of Sadhu Singh. Bhaura became politically active in the student movement, serving as secretary of the Punjab branch of the All India Students Federation and president of the All India Youth Federation in Punjab. He obtained a B.A. degree from Govt Ripudaman College Nabha Panjab University. During the colonial period, he took part in the struggle for Indian independence as well being active in the peasant movement.

Legislator
He was elected to the Punjab Legislative Assembly in 1962, from the Dhuri (SC) seat. Bhaura obtained 20,658 votes (49.08% of the votes in the constituency), defeating the Congress, Jan Sangh and Swatantra candidates in the fray. He became the acting president of the Punjab Dihati Mazdoor Sabha (agricultural workers' union). In the 1967 election, he was elected to the Punjab Legislative Assembly from the Bhadaur (SC) seat. He obtained 14,748 votes (49.92%). Bhaura lost the Bhadaur seat in the 1969 election, finishing in third place with merely 430 votes (1.31%).

Parliamentarian
He won the Bhatinda Lok Sabha seat in the 1971 general election. He obtained 138,092 votes (51.46%). Bhaura survived the 1973 crash of Indian Airlines Flight 440.

Later elections
Bhaura lost the Bhatinda seat in the 1977 general election. He finished in third place with 62,639 votes (14.73%). This time the electoral contest in Bhatinda had been between Congress and Shiromani Akali Dal candidates, and Bhaura lost his deposit. He contested the Bhadaur assembly seat in 1985, finishing in third place with 7,932 votes (14.98%).

Return to the Lok Sabha
Bhaura contested the Bhatinda seat in the 1998 general election. He finished in second place with 309,671 votes (45.66%). He regained the Bhatinda Lok Sabha seat in the 1999 general election. He obtained 327,484 votes (50.34%). His candidature was supported by Congress. In the Lok Sabha he was a member of the Committee on Science and Technology, Environment and Forests 1999-2000, and then a member of the Consultative Committee of the Ministry of Communications 2000-2004.

Personal life
Mr. Bhan Singh Bhaura’s father was Mr. Sadhu Singh Shoe Maker Ramdasia Sikh  & mother Mrs. Sardhi. village Niamatpur Dist Sangrur tehsil Malerkotla Near Amargarh. Mr. Bhaura completed his graduation at Govt.Ripudaman College, Nabha, District. Patiala.  He married on 13 November 1966 to Kaushalya Chaman. He is survived by a son Rajneek Bhaura who is a doctor and two daughters Dr.Rishma Bhaura and Reenu Bhaura.
He has two granddaughters: Jannat Deep Bhaura and Priya Raj Bhaura. Their son is married to Deepinder Kaur Rana who is an advocate. Their family hails from Malerkotla and currently lives in Bathinda, Punjab

Survived From The Air Crash
On 30 May 1973, Flight 440 was a scheduled domestic passenger flight from Madras (now Chennai), Tamil Nadu to New Delhi. A Boeing 737 named Saranga was used for the flight. As Flight 440 approached Palam International Airport in driving dust and a rainstorm, the aircraft struck high tension wires during a NDB approach with visibility below minima. The aircraft crashed and caught fire. 48 of the 65 passengers and crew on board Flight 440 perished in the accident.[2] Rescue officials said the survivors were in the front of the aircraft.
Among the dead was Indian Minister of Iron and Steel Mines, Mohan Kumaramangalam. Kumaramangalam was a confidant of Indira Gandhi, who was India's Prime Minister at the time. According to Mehtab-Ud-Din, a Senior Punjabi Journalist & Writer, Mr. Bhan Singh Bhaura was also in the 'unfortunate' flight, but luckily he survived. Mr. Bhan Singh Bhaura was then an MP from Bathinda (Punjab) for 5th Lok Sabha (1971-1977) Seat. He was a committed CPI Member and he again was elected MP for 13th Lok Sabha (1999-2004). When Mrs. Indira Gandhi, then Prime Minister of India, met the slightly injured Mr. Bhan Singh Bhaura on 31 May 1973 in a New Delhi Hospital, She said to him,"Mr. Bhaura, you have survived from an air crash, now you should believe in God." Mr. Bhaura replied instantaneously that those were perished in the air crash, all were firm believers in God. It is worth mentioning here that most of the Communists are supposed to be the atheists. Mr. Bhan Singh Bhaura himself told about it to Mr. Mehtab-Ud-Din.

References

1934 births
2004 deaths
India MPs 1977–1979
People from Sangrur district
Survivors of aviation accidents or incidents
India MPs 1998–1999
Communist Party of India politicians from Punjab, India
People from Bathinda
Lok Sabha members from Punjab, India